The Pet Girl of Sakurasou is a 24-episode anime television series adaptation, produced by J.C.Staff and directed by Atsuko Ishizuka, that aired in Japan between October 9, 2012 and March 26, 2013 on Tokyo MX. It has been licensed by Sentai Filmworks in North America. The series was also simulcasted on Crunchyroll. The series makes use of five pieces of theme music: three opening themes and two ending themes. The first opening theme is  sung by Pet na Kanojotachi, consisting of Ai Kayano, Mariko Nakatsu, and Natsumi Takamori. The first ending theme "Days of Dash" is by Konomi Suzuki. The opening theme of episode 14 is "I Call Your Name Again" by Mariko Nakatsu under her character name Nanami Aoyama.

Episode list

References

Pet Girl of Sakurasou